Lage Roland Andréasson (born 15 September 1930) is a former Swedish trade union leader.

Andréasson served as the president of the Swedish Food Workers' Union (Livs) from 1979 until 1991, and as president of the International Union of Food, Agricultural, Hotel, Restaurant, Catering, Tobacco and Allied Workers' Associations from 1989 until 1993.  After retiring, he wrote a book on the history of Livs.  From 1996 until 2004, he served as president of the Swedish National Pensioners' Organisation.  In 2004, he was awarded the Illis quorum medal.

References

1930 births
Living people
Swedish trade union leaders
Recipients of the Illis quorum